The Walter C. Lyne House, at 1135 East South Temple St. in Salt Lake City, Utah, was built in 1898.  It was listed on the National Register of Historic Places in 1979.

It was built for Walter C. Lyne, and is "considered to be the finest remaining work of Jasper N. Melton, a local builder who also designed the homes he built."

References

Houses on the National Register of Historic Places in Utah
Colonial Revival architecture in Utah
Houses completed in 1898
Houses in Salt Lake City
National Register of Historic Places in Salt Lake City